Robert Matheson may refer to: 
Robert Matheson (architect)
Robert Matheson (entomologist)
Bob Matheson, National Football League player